The King James Version is an  English translation of the Bible, first published in 1611.

King James Version may also refer to:

Revised Version, a late 19th-century revision of the King James Version
New King James Version, a modern, 20th-century Bible translation
American Standard Version, a revision of the Revised Version translation of the Bible, published in 1901
21st Century King James Version, a further revision, published in 1994
King James Only movement, believe that the KJV is the greatest English translation ever produced, needing no further improvements, and that all other English translations produced after the KJV are corrupt
,King James Version (album), an album by Harvey Danger
"King James Version", a song by Billy Bragg featured on his 1996 album William Bloke

See also
James I of England